Anders Bjerring Qvist (born 31 July 1987) is a Danish professional football defender, who currently is playing at Brønshøj BK. He played eight games for FC Nordsjælland during the Danish Superliga 2006-07 season.

References

External links

Brønshøj BK profile
National team profile
Danish Superliga statistics

1987 births
Living people
Danish men's footballers
Danish Superliga players
Denmark under-21 international footballers
Boldklubben af 1893 players
FC Nordsjælland players
FC Roskilde players
Association football defenders
Fremad Amager players